The Good Shepherd Academy (GSA) is a Catholic school located in Poblacion 2, Victoria, Oriental Mindoro, Philippines.

Schools in Oriental Mindoro
Educational institutions with year of establishment missing
Catholic elementary schools in the Philippines
Catholic secondary schools in the Philippines